The Hangar Flight Museum, formerly known as the Aero Space Museum of Calgary, is a museum located south of Calgary International Airport in Calgary, Alberta, Canada.

History
The museum was founded in 1975 as the Aero Space Museum Association of Calgary by aviation enthusiasts and former World War II pilots. It built upon the history of an earlier private collection called the Air Museum of Canada. The museum moved to its current location in a former British Commonwealth Air Training Plan hangar in 1985.

A renovation was carried out in 2016 that included replacing the roof and installing a new HVAC system. That same year, the museum changed its name to The Hangar Flight Museum.

Following a seven-year restoration, the museum's Hawker Hurricane returned in 2019.

The museum's annex, a building used to store aircraft from its collection, had its fabric roof badly damaged in a windstorm in March 2023. This was the second time the building had been damaged by weather. The museum is engaged in fundraising to construct a new museum building.

Exhibits
The museum has an exhibit Canadian space programs as well as an archives containing documents about aeronautics.

A central War memorial stone slab and four other memorial slabs were erected by the Aircrew Association (Southern Alberta Branch) and the Aero Space Museum Association of Calgary. The plaque  name the commonwealth air forces who trained in Calgary as part of the British Commonwealth Air Training Plan during the Second World War: Royal Canadian Air Force (RCAF); Royal Air Force (RAF); Royal Australian Air Force (RAAF); Royal New Zealand Air Force (RNZAF). In front of the slabs, a gravel mural of a Canadian roundel was painted.

The Aero Space Museum Association of Calgary erected a list of honour memorial dedicated to the Alberta Airmen who were killed in the Second World War.

The museum is affiliated with CMA,  CHIN, and Virtual Museum of Canada.

Aircraft on display

Airplanes

 AEA Silver Dart – replica
 Aeronca 7AC Champion 7AC770
 Avro Anson II Composite
 Avro Lancaster X FM136
 Avro Canada CF-100 Canuck IIID 18126
 Barkley-Grow T8P-1 8
 Beechcraft Expeditor 3NM Q/E 92-074
 Canadian Car and Foundry Harvard IV 20273
 Cessna 140 10825
 Cessna Ag Wagon 0007
 de Havilland Tiger Moth 3886
 de Havilland Vampire F.3 17069
 de Havilland Canada DHC-6 Twin Otter 2
 Douglas DC-3 13448
 Hawker Hurricane XII 5389
 McDonnell CF-101 Voodoo 101021
 North American F-86A Sabre 47-606
 QAC Quickie Q2
 Sopwith Triplane – replica
 Taylorcraft Auster VII
 Waco ECQ-6 4479

Gliders
 Hall Cherokee II

Helicopters

 Aérospatiale Alouette III
 Bell 47G
 Sikorsky S-51
 Sikorsky S-55

See also
Organization of Military Museums of Canada
List of aerospace museums
List of attractions and landmarks in Calgary
Calgary

References

External links

History of the Canadian Forces Museums 1919-2004

Museums in Calgary
Military and war museums in Canada
Aerospace museums in Alberta
1975 establishments in Alberta
Calgary International Airport